Edmilson Dias de Lucena (born 29 May 1968), known simply as Edmilson, is a Brazilian retired footballer who played as a forward.

Football career
Born in Emas, Paraíba, Edmilson arrived in Portugal at the age of 20, and would remain in the country for the following decade – exactly 13 full seasons plus the start of the 2001–02 campaign – always in the Primeira Liga. He started his career in Madeira, representing both C.D. Nacional and C.S. Marítimo.

In 1997 Edmilson moved to Vitória de Guimarães, scoring six goals in his debut season as the Minho side finished in third position (he bettered that individual total in the following two years). In the summer of 2000, the 32-year-old stayed in the region after signing with S.C. Braga, and wasted no time in contributing, netting 11 times in a narrow miss on qualification to the UEFA Cup after a fourth-place finish.

Late into 2001, Edmilson had a brief spell with Al-Hilal FC after having appeared in 356 matches in the Portuguese top flight and scored 112 goals. He finished his career at the age of 37 after a three-year spell with another Asian team, South Korea's Jeonbuk Hyundai Motors.

Honours

Club
Asian Cup Winners' Cup: 2002
Korean FA Cup: 2003, 2005
Korean Super Cup: 2004

Individual
Asian Cup Winners' Cup: MVP 2002
K-League: Top Scorer 2002, Top Assister 2003
Korean FA Cup: MVP 2003
Korean Super Cup: MVP 2004

References

External links

1968 births
Living people
Brazilian footballers
Association football forwards
Primeira Liga players
C.D. Nacional players
C.S. Marítimo players
Vitória S.C. players
S.C. Braga players
Saudi Professional League players
Al Hilal SFC players
K League 1 players
Jeonbuk Hyundai Motors players
Brazilian expatriate footballers
Expatriate footballers in Portugal
Expatriate footballers in Saudi Arabia
Expatriate footballers in South Korea
Brazilian expatriate sportspeople in Portugal
Brazilian expatriate sportspeople in Saudi Arabia
Brazilian expatriate sportspeople in South Korea